Fraoch Bheinn (858 m) is a remote mountain in the Northwest Highlands, Scotland, located at the head  of Loch Arkaig in Lochaber.

Glen Dessary lies to the south and the Glen Kingie on its northern side.

References

Mountains and hills of the Northwest Highlands
Marilyns of Scotland
Corbetts